Beauty in the Broken is the third album released by the Christian music band Starfield. It was a 2007 Juno Award nominee for Contemporary Christian/Gospel Album of the Year. The album includes the song "Son of God" recorded with Chris Tomlin. The single "Everything is Beautiful" was the 17th most played song on Christian Hit Radio in 2007.

Beauty in the Broken immediately went to the top of the Canadian Christian music sales chart and remained at the No. 1 position for three months. 2006 Year End charts placed the album at No. 2 for the year in Canada at Christian retail stores. The album peaked at No. 31 in the United States on the Billboard Top Christian Albums chart, and at No. 45 on the Billboard Top Heatseekers chart.

Track listing 
 "My Generation" – 4:34
 "The Hand That Holds the World" – 4:46
 "Son of God" – 4:23
 "Everything Is Beautiful" – 4:05
 "Captivate" – 4:51
 "Great Is The Lord" – 4:54
 "Unashamed" – 5:04
 "Love Is The Reversal" – 3:58
 "Obsession" – 5:32
 "Glorious One" – 4:42
 "Shipwreck" – 4:04

Personnel 
 Jon Neufeld - vocals
 Shaun Huberts - vocals, bass guitar
 Tim Neufeld - vocals, guitar

Notes 

2006 albums
Starfield (band) albums